Han Kyo-won (born 15 June 1990) is a South Korean association football forward, who plays for Jeonbuk Hyundai Motors.

Club career
Han joined Incheon United for the 2011 K-League season.  His first game for Incheon was as a late substitute in the loss to Gyeongnam FC in the fourth week of the league. Three days later, Han was a starter in the 2011 K-League Cup group game against Daegu, which finished in a goalless draw.  Increasingly being included in the starting lineup for Incheon despite his relative youth, Han scored his first goal in the opening minutes of the match against Jeonbuk Hyundai Motors, which ultimately ended up in a 6 - 2 thrashing at the hands of the Jeonju based club.

National career
Han represented South Korea at national level on a number of occasions, playing in 10 games from 2014 to 2015. He has scored one goal, in a friendly game against Jordan. He also played in the 2015 AFC Asian Cup.

Career statistics

Club

International
Scores and results list South Korea's goal tally first.

Honours

Club
Jeonbuk Hyundai Motors
 K League 1: 2014, 2015, 2017, 2018, 2019, 2020, 2021
 Korean FA Cup: 2020, 2022
 AFC Champions League: 2016

International
South Korea
 AFC Asian Cup runner-up: 2015

Individual
 K League Best XI: 2014, 2020

References

External links

1990 births
Living people
Association football forwards
South Korean footballers
Incheon United FC players
Jeonbuk Hyundai Motors players
Hwaseong FC players
K League 1 players
2015 AFC Asian Cup players
People from Chungju
South Korea international footballers
Sportspeople from North Chungcheong Province